Byron Bertram defeated the defending champion John Alexander in the final, 7–5, 5–7, 6–4 to win the boys' singles tennis title at the 1969 Wimbledon Championships.

Draw

Finals

Top half

Bottom half

References

External links

Boys' Singles
Wimbledon Championship by year – Boys' singles